The Top Spin is a thrill ride developed by HUSS Park Attractions and Mondial, and is the generic name for a series of rides from other manufacturers that follow the same principle. The ride consists of a passenger platform suspended between two counterweighted arms. The arms are turned by motors, while the platform typically only has brakes that are engaged and disengaged at various points of the ride cycle. A typical top spin program runs the main arm motors while engaging and disengaging the platform brakes so that it will rotate in exciting ways. The minimum rider height requirement is 54 inches; maximum is 80 inches due to the seat and restraint design. The ride was introduced to the public in 1990 and proved an instant success with European fairgoers.

Ride experience
Huss has designed the ride so that park and carnival operators may choose one of eight preset ride "programs." Most last no more than two minutes and consist of several moderate-speed loops, flips, and face-down gondola "hangtime" before unlocking the gondola hydraulics and swinging the riders back and forth. Some Top Spin rides have the added feature of water fountains which are mainly used at the end of the ride sequence soaking the riders as they are slowly lowered face first into the un-escapable water jets. Cycles can be customized to include more intense repetitive flips and also be under manual operator control. A world record was set with over 100 gondola flips during a cycle with a theme park model in Germany.

Variations
 The original Topspin concept has two rows of seating with self lowering lap bars and rider spotlights.
 The Giant Top Spin is a larger version of the Top Spin, seating up to 84 passengers in three rows on the platform. Only one park in the United States featured a Giant Top Spin, The Crypt at Kings Island in Ohio. However, its third row was removed in 2008, reducing the capacity. The ride structure was still larger than any other. It closed after the 2011 season.
 The Suspended Top Spin is a floorless version of the ride that can hold up to 40 passengers in two rows back to back.
 The Top Spin 2 is a smaller version of the original, designed for showmen who require a ride that fits onto a single trailer. This version enables the platform to perform almost endless loops. This version tends to have telescoping drum supports to hold the main control arms.

There are also numerous other Top Spin rides that were later developed by other companies as rivals to the Huss versions.

In addition to this, various manufacturers such as Mondial, Moser, Vekoma, and Zamperla make an improved version of the Top Spin where each individual arm is controlled separately; this results in diagonal gondola inversions. Such rides are known by names like "Wind Shear", "Super Loop on Top", "Waikiki Wave Super Flip","Super Nova" and "Discovery".

Installations

The Top Spin was once a common ride at travelling funfairs, particularly in Germany. Over time, many of the travelling versions of the ride have been sold to amusement parks. Huss also makes several models of Top Spin specifically for static locations.

See also

 Ali Baba (ride)
 Rainbow (ride)

References

Amusement rides